Witsand is a small coastal town situated at the mouth of the Breede River in the Western Cape, South Africa. It is a good fishing area and is widely considered to be the whale nursery of the South African coastline. Witsand has seen some of the largest bull sharks caught in the Breede River, although no shark attacks on people have been recorded to date. It is also popular for kitesurfing and windsurfing due to the summer South-Easter.. Every year Witsand serves as the finish for the Heidelberg to Witsand marathon and half-marathon road running race.

Water supply
A solar-powered desalination plant is under development in Witsand, owned and funded by the government of France and the government of Western Cape Province, on a 50/50 basis. Witsand Solar Desalination Plant was budgeted at approximately ZAR:9 million (about US$700,000) and was expected to produce 100,000 liters of potable water daily.

References

External links 
 Witsand Tourism
 Witsand Accommodation and Information - http://www.stay-at-witsand.co.za

Populated places in the Hessequa Local Municipality